The 2022 FA Challenge Cup was the 48th edition of the FA Challenge Cup, Botswana's premier football knockout tournament. It was sponsored by Orange and was known as the Orange FA Cup or Orange FA Cup Season 3 for sponsorship reasons. It started with the preliminary round on the weekend of 26 February and concluded with the final on 18 June 2022.

Gaborone United were the defending champions and went on to retain the cup after beating Security Systems in the final, extending their record and becoming the first club since Mogoditshane Fighters in 2000 to successfully defend the title.

Qualifying rounds
All 16 Premier League teams automatically qualified to the round of 32. The top 8 teams from First Division South and top 8 from First Division North had to go through the preliminary round and were joined by the 16 regional champions. Winners of this round qualified for the round of 32.

Preliminary round
The preliminary round draw took place on 9 February 2022. The draw was seeded into two, namely the northern and southern blocks. Northern block games were played on 26 and 27 February while southern block games were played on 5 and 6 March.

Northern block

Southern block

1 The match was originally supposed to be played on 5 March but was postponed due to the pitch being waterlogged as a result of heavy rains.

2 The match was originally supposed to be played on 5 March but was postponed due to the pitch being waterlogged as a result of heavy rains.

Round of 32
The round of 32 draw was conducted on 18 January 2022. It was not seeded. Tsabotlhe, BIUST All Stars, and Kgabosetso from Division One were the lowest ranked teams still in the competition.

Round of 16
The round of 16 draw was conducted on 24 April. It was not seeded. BIUST All Stars was the lowest ranked team still in the competition.

1 The match was originally scheduled to be played on 30 April but was abandoned with Matebele leading 1-0 due to the pitch being waterlogged after heavy rains.

Quarterfinals
The quarterfinal draw was conducted on 1 May after the conclusion of the round of 16. It was not seeded. Matebele from First Division South was the lowest ranked club still in the competition.

Semifinals
The semifinal draw was conducted on 24 May.

Final

References

Football competitions in Botswana
Football in Botswana